John Barnes European Football is a soccer video game developed by Krisalis in 1992. The game was endorsed by popular footballer John Barnes.

Gameplay 
The game resembles Krisalis' previous video game Manchester United Europe. However, the camera is closer to the ball, producing a faster action.

Reception

References

External links 
 Game at GameSpot

1992 video games
Association football video games
Amiga games
Atari ST games
Europe-exclusive video games
Krisalis Software games
Video games based on real people
Video games developed in the United Kingdom
Cultural depictions of association football players
Cultural depictions of Jamaican men
Cultural depictions of British men